Cecil Augustus Wright (July 2, 1904April 24, 1967), often called Caesar Wright, was a Canadian jurist and law professor. He was among the first law professors to import the Harvard case method into Canadian legal education. He was also known for his confrontational and aggressive personality.

Early life and education 
Cecil Augustus Wright was born in London, Ontario, on July 2, 1904, to Emily Rosana (Whitehold) and Thomas Augustus Wright. He received a BA from the University of Western Ontario in 1923, where he studied economics, history, and political science.

In 1926, at age 22, he graduated from Osgoode Hall Law School.

Career 
Wright taught at Osgoode from 1927. During this time he championed many reforms of the legal education system, and in particular favoured a greater role for classroom instruction over the existing apprenticeship model.

In 1949, the Law Society of Upper Canada rejected his proposed reforms and Wright left Osgoode to become dean of the University of Toronto Faculty of Law. Together with other professors, including Bora Laskin, he shaped the undergraduate law program into a professional law school, which was eventually accredited by the Law Society in 1957. He remained with the university until his death on April 24, 1967, in Toronto. Before his death, he had resigned effective June 30 of that year.

According to the legal historian R. Blake Brown, Wright has been regarded as "the founder of Canadian tort law scholarship".

Notes

Sources

External links
 Canadian Encyclopedia entry
Cecil A. Wright archival papers held at the University of Toronto Archives and Records Management Services

1904 births
1967 deaths
20th-century Canadian lawyers
Canadian legal scholars
Lawyers in Ontario
Legal educators
People from London, Ontario
Academic staff of the University of Toronto
Academic staff of the University of Toronto Faculty of Law